Scott Weintrob is a film and commercials director based in Los Angeles, California. He is the founder of Large Eyes a creative studio with recent clients Rihanna, Offset, Cardi B, and Lil Yachty.

Weintrob is currently in production on the feature film The Paradox Effect, starring Olga Kurylenko and Harvey Keitel. Releasing in 2024.

Working with iconic brands and public figures such as Apple, Netflix, Amazon studios, Migos, Cardi B, Chance The Rapper, Lil Yachty and more. Scott Weintrob’s creativity is a unique blend of storytelling and the embodiment of authentic street culture.

Weintrob wrote and designed creative for Rihanna’s Emmy winning Savage x Fenty show debuting on Amazon. Collaborating with Rihanna and many top talent across fashion, music and film including Cindy Crawford, Emily Ratajkowski, Gigi Hadid, Irina Shayk and Adriana Lima.
 
Weintrob directed episodes for the Emmy nominated documentary series Home on Apple+.  

The global hit series Fastest Car was created and directed by Weintrob for Netflix. 

Weintrob has directed global commercial campaigns for brands including Audi, Cadillac, Volvo and Corvette to name a few. 

His recent work with Ford featured Metallica’s ‘Enter Sandman’. He has received awards including the Cannes Lion. In September 2021, he had signed a deal with Boat Rocker.

Early Years 
Weintrob's formative years were spent as a photographer's assistant at the famous East London Click Studios where he assisted fashion photographers Jean-Baptiste Mondino, Albert Watson, Rankin and David Simms for magazines including Vogue, and Dazed and Confused.

Filmography

References

British film directors
Year of birth missing (living people)
Living people